Svit or SVIT may refer to:

 Svit, Poprad District, Slovakia
 Brina Svit (born 1954), Slovenian writer
 Bucciero SVIT, a single engine, mid-wing, training and touring aircraft
 FK Svit, a Slovak football club
 Sai Vidya Institute of Technology, Bangalore, Karnataka, India
 Sardar Vallabhbhai Patel Institute of Technology,  Vasad, Gujarat, India
 Swami Vivekananda Institute of Technology, Secunderabad, Andhra Pradesh, India

See also